Barmeen is a townland in County Antrim, Northern Ireland. It is located at the foot of Glendun, one of the nine Glens of Antrim, west of Cushendun and north of Knocknacarry. It is situated in the historic barony of Cary and the civil parish of Culfeightrin and covers 59 acres.

The name derives from the Irish: Barr min (smooth top). The population of the townland declined during the 19th century:

See also
List of townlands in County Antrim

References 

Townlands of County Antrim
Barony of Cary